Jack Robert Marshman (born December 19, 1989) is a retired Welsh professional mixed martial artist who competed in the Middleweight division. A professional competitor since 2010, he has competed for Ultimate Fighting Championship (UFC), BAMMA and Cage Warriors. He is the former BAMMA Lonsdale Middleweight Champion and former Cage Warriors Middleweight Champion.

Background
Marshman started training MMA when he was 15 when his dad introduced him to his friend who is a mixed martial arts (MMA) coach, Richard Shore. After the first MMA training session, Marshman was instantly hooked and spent much of his time in the gym there after. He claimed that learning MMA taught him to stay out of troubles in his teenage life.

Marshman joined the army at the age of 17. He served as a Lance Corporal with The 3rd Battalion, The Parachute Regiment, for 10 years, where he was deployed to Afghanistan. He serves as a Paratrooper while fighting MMA professionally. He believed his military service helped him to develop the physical and mental toughness and self-discipline which would help him in his MMA career.

Mixed martial arts career

Early career
Marshman fought in the European circuit and he was the Middleweight Cage Warriors Fighting Championship (CWFC) Champion  He amassed a record of 20-5 prior joining UFC. Marshman was the first Welshman signed by UFC.

Ultimate Fighting Championship
Marshman made his UFC debut on 19 November 2016 at UFC Fight Night: Mousasi vs. Hall 2. He faced Magnus Cedenblad and won his first UFC win via TKO one round two.

On 19 February 2017 Marshman faced Thiago Santos at UFC Fight Night: Lewis vs. Browne. Marshman came out aggressively on round one but he was dropped to the floor on round two after he was hit by Santos's spinning wheel kick and followed by a series of striking to his face and lost the fight via a TKO.

Marshman faced Ryan Janes at UFC Fight Night: Nelson vs. Ponzinibbio on 16 July 2017. He won the fight via unanimous decision.

Marshman faced Antônio Carlos Júnior on 28 October 2017 at UFC Fight Night 119. He lost the fight via submission.

Marshman was expected to face Elizeu Zaleski dos Santos on 17 March 2018 at UFC Fight Night 127. However, on 19 February 2018 it was announced that Zaleski was pulled from the event, citing knee injury. He was replaced by Brad Scott. Subsequently, Marshman was removed from the card two days before the event for medical issues surrounding his weight cut and his fight with Scott was scrapped.

Marshman faced Karl Roberson on 3 November 2018 at UFC 230. He lost the fight via unanimous decision.

Marshman faced John Phillips on 16 March 2019 at UFC Fight Night 147 At the weigh-ins, Marshman weighed in at 188 lbs, 2 pounds over the middleweight non-title fight limit of 186 lbs. He was fined 20% of his fight purse and the bout proceeded at catchweight. Marshman won the bout via split decision. Marshman received a formal warning from the military due to participating in the fight week against orders.

Marshman faced Edmen Shahbazyan on 6 July 2019 at UFC 239. He lost the fight via a rear-naked choke submission in the first round.

Marshman was scheduled to face Markus Perez on 16 November 2019 at UFC Fight Night 164. However, Marshman was pulled from the event for undisclosed reason and he was replaced by Wellington Turman.

Marshman was expected to face Kevin Holland 21 March 2020 at UFC Fight Night: Woodley vs. Edwards. However, due to COVID-19 pandemic, the event was cancelled.

Mashman faced Sean Strickland, replacing Wellington Turman, on 31 October 2020 at UFC Fight Night 181. At the weight-ins, Marshman weighed in at 187.5 pounds, one and a half pounds over the middleweight non-title fight limit. The bout proceeded at catchweight and Marshman was fined a percentage of his purses, which went to Strickland. Marshman lost the fight via unanimous decision.

Since the loss, Marshman has retired from MMA.

Championships and accomplishments

Mixed martial arts
Cage Warrior Fighting Championship (CWFC)
Cage Warrior Fighting Championship Middleweight Championship (One time)  vs. Christopher Jacquelin 
BAMMA Championship
BAMMA Lonsdale Middleweight Championship (One time)  vs. Leeroy Barnes 
Made4TheCage Fighting Championships (M4TC)
Made4TheCage Middleweight Championship (One time)  vs. Kyle RedfearnUltimate Fighting Championship'''
Performance of the Night (One time) vs. Magnus Cedenblad

Mixed martial arts record

|-
|Loss
|align=center|23–10
|Sean Strickland
|Decision (unanimous)
|UFC Fight Night: Hall vs. Silva
|
|align=center|3
|align=center|5:00
|Las Vegas, Nevada, United States
|
|-
|Loss
|align=center|23–9
|Edmen Shahbazyan
|Submission (rear-naked choke)
|UFC 239 
|
|align=center|1
|align=center|1:12
|Las Vegas, Nevada, United States
|
|-
|Win
|align=center|23–8
|John Phillips
|Decision (split)
|UFC Fight Night: Till vs. Masvidal 
|
|align=center|3
|align=center|5:00
|London, England
|
|-
|Loss
|align=center|22–8
|Karl Roberson
|Decision (unanimous)
|UFC 230 
|
|align=center|3
|align=center|5:00
|New York City, New York, United States
| 
|-
|Loss
|align=center|22–7
|Antônio Carlos Júnior
|Submission (rear-naked choke)
|UFC Fight Night: Brunson vs. Machida
|
|align=center|1
|align=center|4:30
|São Paulo, Brazil
|
|-
|Win
|align=center|22–6
|Ryan Janes
|Decision (unanimous)
|UFC Fight Night: Nelson vs. Ponzinibbio 
|
|align=center|3
|align=center|5:00
|Glasgow, Scotland
|
|-
| Loss
| align=center| 21–6
| Thiago Santos
| TKO (spinning wheel kick and punches)
| UFC Fight Night: Lewis vs. Browne
| 
| align=center| 2
| align=center| 2:21
| Halifax, Nova Scotia, Canada
|
|-
| Win
| align=center| 21–5
| Magnus Cedenblad
| TKO (punches)
| UFC Fight Night: Mousasi vs. Hall 2
| 
| align=center| 2
| align=center| 3:32
| Belfast, Northern Ireland
|
|-
| Win
| align=center| 20–5
| Christopher Jacquelin
| TKO (punch)
| CWFC 77
| 
| align=center| 2
| align=center| 3:32
| London, England
|
|-
| Win
| align=center| 19–5
| Ali Arish
| Submission (guillotine choke)
| CWFC 76
| 
| align=center| 1
| align=center| 4:58
| Newport, Wales
|
|-
| Win
| align=center| 18–5
| Shaun Lomas
| Submission (rear-naked choke)
| Pain Pit Fight Night 15
| 
| align=center| 1
| align=center| 3:45
| Ebbw Vale, Wales
|
|-
| Win
| align=center| 17–5
| Kyle Redfearn
| Decision (majority)
| M4tC 18
| 
| align=center| 2
| align=center| 1:50
| Newcastle, England
|
|-
| Win
| align=center| 16–5
| Che Mills
| TKO (punches)
| CWFC 72
| 
| align=center| 3
| align=center| 5:00
| Newport, Wales
|
|-
| Win
| align=center| 15–5
| Bola Omoyele
| Submission (armbar)
| CWFC 69
| 
| align=center| 2
| align=center| 1:32
| London, England
|
|-
| Loss
| align=center| 14–5
| Abu Azaitar
| TKO (punches)
| CWFC: Fight Night 10
| 
| align=center| 1
| align=center| 4:51
| Amman, Jordan
|
|-
| Win
| align=center| 14–4
| Alex Minogue
| Decision (unanimous)
| Extreme Cage Championships: Banned 2
| 
| align=center| 3
| align=center| 5:00
| Manchester, England
|
|-
| Win
| align=center| 13–4
| Simas Norkus
| TKO (punches)
| Pain Pit Fight Night 9
| 
| align=center| 2
| align=center| 1:19
| Newport, Wales
|
|-
| Loss
| align=center| 12–4
| Ion Pascu
| KO (punches)
| BAMMA 13
| 
| align=center| 1
| align=center| 4:02
| Birmingham, England
|
|-
| Loss
| align=center| 12–3
| Scott Askham
| Decision (unanimous)
| Ultimate Cage Fighting Championships 5
| 
| align=center| 3
| align=center| 5:00
| Doncaster, England
|
|-
| Win
| align=center| 12–2
| Wayne Cole
| TKO (punches)
| GWC: The British Invasion: U.S. vs. U.K.
| 
| align=center| 1
| align=center| 1:26
| Kansas City, Missouri, United States
|
|-
| Loss
| align=center| 11–2
| Xavier Foupa-Pokam
| Decision (split)
| BAMMA 11
| 
| align=center| 3
| align=center| 5:00
| Birmingham, England
|
|-
| Win
| align=center| 11–1
| Andrew Punshon
| Submission (triangle choke)
| BAMMA 10
| 
| align=center| 1
| align=center| 2:31
| London, England
| 
|-
| Loss
| align=center| 10–1
| Tom Watson
| TKO (elbows)
| BAMMA 9
| 
| align=center| 2
| align=center| 4:50
| Birmingham, England
|
|-
| Win
| align=center| 10–0
| Leeroy Barnes
| Decision (unanimous)
| BAMMA 8
| 
| align=center| 3
| align=center| 5:00
| Nottingham, England
|
|-
| Win
| align=center| 9–0
| Carl Noon
| TKO (punches)
| BAMMA 7
| 
| align=center| 3
| align=center| 2:09
| Birmingham, England
|
|-
| Win
| align=center| 8–0
| Mike Ling
| Submission (armbar)
| Shock n' Awe 8
| 
| align=center|1
| align=center|N/A
| Portsmouth, England
|
|-
| Win
| align=center| 7–0
| Lee Chadwick
| TKO (punhes)
| Olympian MMA Championships 10
| 
| align=center| 1
| align=center| 1:37
| Liverpool, England
|
|-
| Win
| align=center| 6–0
| Kevin Reed
| KO (punch)
| Valley of Kings 1
| 
| align=center| 1
| align=center| 2:59
| Cardiff, Wales
|
|-
| Win
| align=center| 5–0
| Kevin Reed
| TKO (punches)
| Ready To Rage 2
| 
| align=center| 1
| align=center| 0:00
| Newport, Wales
|
|-
| Win
| align=center| 4–0
| Paul Jenkins
| TKO (punches)
| Samurai Fight Night 1
| 
| align=center| 2
| align=center| 0:00
| Abertillery, Wales
|
|-
| Win
| align=center| 3–0
| Leonardo Queiroz
| TKO (punches)
| Spartan Fight Challenge 3
| 
| align=center| 2
| align=center| 0:00
| Newport, Wales
|
|-
| Win
| align=center| 2–0
| Andrew Cochran
| TKO (punches)
| KnuckleUp MMA 4
| 
| align=center| 1
| align=center| 1:51
| Cheltenham, England
|
|-
| Win
| align=center| 1–0
| Karim Mammar
| TKO (injury)
| Ready to Rage 1
| 
| align=center| 2
| align=center| 0:43
| Newport, Wales
|
|-

See also 
 List of male mixed martial artists

References

External links 
 
 

Living people
1989 births
Welsh male mixed martial artists
Middleweight mixed martial artists
Mixed martial artists utilizing Brazilian jiu-jitsu
Sportspeople from Abertillery
Ultimate Fighting Championship male fighters
Welsh practitioners of Brazilian jiu-jitsu